Raymond Anthony Roundtree (born April 19, 1966) is a former American football wide receiver in the National Football League (NFL) who played for the Detroit Lions. He played college football at Penn State University.

References 

1966 births
Living people
Sportspeople from Aiken, South Carolina
Players of American football from South Carolina
American football wide receivers
Penn State Nittany Lions football players
Detroit Lions players